Nicholas IV of Bruntál (also known as Nicholas IV of Ratibor and Bruntál, also Nicholas I of Opava-Ratibor; ; ;  – ) was a member of the Opava branch of the Přemyslid dynasty.  He was co-ruler of Ratibor and Bruntál with his brother John II "the Iron".

Life 
His parents were Duke John I of Opava-Ratibor and his wife Anna, a daughter of Duke Henry V of Glogau-Sagan (d. 1369).  His father had inherited the Duchy of Ratibor in 1365 as the sole heir and became the founder of the Opava-Ratibor line of the Opavian branch of the Přemyslid dynasty.

Nicholas IV was still a minor when his father died in 1380/1382.  His older brother John II inherited the duchies of Ratibor, Krnov and Bruntál.  Around 1385, a part of Bruntál was split off for Nicholas IV.

Nicholas died around 1406, unmarried and without issue.  His share of Bruntál fell to his brother John II, who then held the whole Duchy of Bruntál.

References 
 Ludwig Petry and Josef Joachim Menzel (eds.): Geschichte Schlesiens, vol 1: Von der Urzeit bis zum Jahre 1526, 5th revised edition, Thorbecke, Stuttgart 1988, p. 191.
 Hugo Weczerka (ed.): Handbuch der historischen Stätten — Schlesien, in the series Kröners Taschenausgabe, vol. 316, Kröner, Stuttgart, 1977, Genealogical tables on p. 600/601

External links

Footnotes 

Silesian nobility
Dukes of Germany
14th-century births
15th-century deaths
15th-century German people
15th-century Bohemian people
Opavian Přemyslids